The 1934–35 Cupa României was the second season in the history of Romania's most prestigious football cup competition.

The surprise of the tournament was ILSA Timișoara, a team from Divizia B which reached the semifinals. Rudolf Wetzer was player-manager for ILSA in the Cup.

The trophy was claimed by CFR București who defeated holders Ripensia Timișoara after extra time.

Format
The competition is an annual knockout tournament with pairings for each round drawn at random.

There are no seeds for the draw. The draw also determines which teams will play at home. Each tie is played as a single leg.

If a match is drawn after 90 minutes, the game goes in extra time, and if the scored is still tight after 120 minutes, there a replay will be played, usually at the ground of the team who were away for the first game.

From the first edition, the teams from Divizia A entered in competition in sixteen finals, rule which remained till today.

The format is almost similar with the oldest recognised football tournament in the world FA Cup.

Bracket

First round proper

|-
|colspan=3 style="background-color:#FFCCCC;"|3 March 1935

|-
|colspan=3 style="background-color:#FFCCCC;"|17 March 1935

|-
|colspan=3 style="background-color:#FFCCCC;"|24 March 1935

|-
|colspan=3 style="background-color:#FFCCCC;"|28 March 1935

|-
|colspan=3 style="background-color:#FFCCCC;"|4 April 1935

|}

Second round proper

|-
|colspan=3 style="background-color:#FFCCCC;"|6 April 1935  

|-
|colspan=3 style="background-color:#FFCCCC;"|7 April 1935

|-
|colspan=3 style="background-color:#FFCCCC;"|18 April 1935

|}

Quarter-finals

|colspan=3 style="background-color:#FFCCCC;"|23 April 1935

|}

Semi-finals

|colspan=3 style="background-color:#FFCCCC;"|30 May 1935

|}

Final

References

External links
romaniansoccer.ro

Cupa României seasons
Cupa
Romania